Johan Lindquist of Stockholm was an important 18th-century Swedish clock and watch maker. He was a pupil of Julien Le Roy in Paris in, perhaps, the 1740s, and in the late 1750s was appointed clock-maker to King Adolf Frederick of Sweden. He died on 4 June 1779. He numbered all his pieces, and was at approximately no. 620 by the time of his death.

References
Gunnar Pipping, Elis Sidenbladh and Erik Elfström Urmakare och klockor i Sverige och Finland Norsted, 1995

External links
A long-case clock by Johan Lindquist.

Businesspeople from Stockholm
Swedish clockmakers
1779 deaths
Year of birth unknown